Alison Venetia Graham Betts  is a Scottish archaeologist and academic, who specialises in the "archaeology of the lands along the Silk Roads" and the nomadic peoples of the Near East. Since 2012, she has been Professor of Silk Road Studies at the University of Sydney.

Early life and education
Betts was born and raised in Scotland. She is the daughter of Ursula Graham Bower, an anthropologist, and Frederick Nicholson Betts, an army officer and ornithologist, and has a sister, Catriona. She studied at the Institute of Archaeology, University of London, graduating with a Bachelor of Arts (BA) degree, a Master of Arts (MA) degree, and a Doctor of Philosophy (PhD) degree. Her doctoral thesis was submitted in 1986 and was titled "The prehistory of the basalt desert, Transjordan: an analysis".

Academic career
In 1986, Betts joined the University of Edinburgh as a British Academy Teaching Fellow. In 1989, she moved to the Queen's University, Belfast, where she worked as a research fellow. In 1991, she was appointed a lecturer in Levantine archaeology at the University of Sydney. By 2010, she had been promoted to senior lecturer. In 2012, she was appointed Professor of Silk Road Studies.

Betts has excavated in the Near East and in Central Asia, including directing excavations in Eastern Jordan, in Uzbekistan, and in Xinjiang, China. Her research is mainly focused on the Bronze Age, archaeology of the Levant, archaeology of the Silk Roads, and nomadic pastoralism of the Near East.

In August 2016, Betts gave that year's Petrie Oration on "Kingship and the Gods in Ancient Khorezm: new light on the early history of Zoroastrianism"; the Petrie Oration is an "annual public lecture sponsored by the Australian Institute of Archaeology on ancient world archaeology".

Honours
In 2010, Betts was elected a Fellow of the Australian Academy of the Humanities (FAHA), the top learned academy in Australia for the humanities. On 13 October 2016, she was elected a Fellow of the Society of Antiquaries of London (FSA).

Selected works

References

Living people
Year of birth missing (living people)
British women archaeologists
Archaeologists of the Near East
Prehistorians
Academic staff of the University of Sydney
Fellows of the Australian Academy of the Humanities
Fellows of the Society of Antiquaries of London
Alumni of the UCL Institute of Archaeology
Academics of the University of Edinburgh
Academics of Queen's University Belfast
Scottish women academics
Scottish archaeologists